Adolf Huschke (14 October 1891 – 29 August 1923) was a German racing cyclist. He won the German National Road Race in 1921.

References

External links

1891 births
1923 deaths
German male cyclists
Cyclists from Berlin
German cycling road race champions
20th-century German people